Cañon City High School (CCHS) is a high school in Cañon City, Colorado, United States. The current campus was built in 1961 with major additions in the 1980s and the late 2000s. The former school building now serves as Cañon City Middle School and was built in 1929.

Athletics
CCHS currently competes in these sports (may be incomplete):
 Football
 Men's and women's basketball
 Baseball
 Tennis
 Men's and women's cross country
 Wrestling
 Golf
 Soccer
 Volleyball
Cheerleading
Dance Team (Tiger Ladies)

Band
The school's band was the Colorado Bandmasters Association 3A State Champions 2017.

Sexting scandal
In 2015, a major sexting scandal at the school involving a significant portion of the student body, including members of the football team, was covered by the media.

References

External links
 

Public high schools in Colorado
Education in Fremont County, Colorado
Buildings and structures in Cañon City, Colorado